Mother Country: Britain, the Welfare State, and Nuclear Pollution (1989) is a work of nonfiction by Marilynne Robinson that tells the story of Sellafield, a government nuclear reprocessing plant located on the coast of the Irish Sea. The book shows how the closest village to Sellafield suffers from death and disease due to decades of waste and radiation from the plant. Mother Country was a National Book Award finalist for Nonfiction in 1989. While on sabbatical in England, Robinson's interest in the environmental ramifications of the plant began when she discovered a newspaper article detailing its hazards.

References

1989 non-fiction books
1989 in the environment
Books about nuclear issues
Pollution in the United Kingdom
Works by Marilynne Robinson